Preben Jensen (15 October 1939 – 28 August 2013) was a Danish footballer. He played in two matches for the Denmark national football team in 1962.

References

External links
 

1939 births
2013 deaths
Danish men's footballers
Denmark international footballers
Place of birth missing
Association footballers not categorized by position